Ramy Najjarine (born 23 April 2000) is an Australian professional footballer who plays as a winger for Australian club Western United.

Early life
Najjarine was born in Sydney in 2000, and is of Lebanese descent.

Club career

Melbourne City
Najjarine signed his first professional contract with Melbourne City on 18 July 2017, penning a three-year scholarship deal with the club. He made his first appearance as a second-half substitute in City's 2–0 loss to Brisbane Roar in Round 5 of the 2018–19 season. In late-April 2019, Najjarine scored his first goal for Melbourne City in a 5–0 win over Central Coast Mariners at AAMI Park.

Western Sydney Wanderers 
On 30 June 2021, Najjarine returned to Western Sydney Wanderers, having already played for their academy. His first goal for the club came on 16 March 2022, helping his side beat Adelaide United 2–1 away from home.

Najjarine played 36 times for the Wanderers in all competitions, before departing the club on a mutual termination mid-way through the 2022-23 season.

Western United
Within hours of his departure from Western Sydney being made public, it was announced that Najjarine had joined Western United.

Personal life 
Najjarine has a younger brother, Zane, who also plays football.

References

External links

 

2000 births
Living people
Sportsmen from New South Wales
Soccer players from New South Wales
Australian people of Lebanese descent
Australian soccer players
Association football midfielders
Association football wingers
FNSW NTC players
Western Sydney Wanderers FC players
Melbourne City FC players
Newcastle Jets FC players
Western United FC players
National Premier Leagues players
A-League Men players
Australia youth international soccer players
Australia under-23 international soccer players